Trial by Fire is the tenth studio album by American rock band Journey. Released on October 22, 1996, the album marked the reunion of the classic 1980s lineup, which had not recorded together since 1983's Frontiers. Trial by Fire was produced by Kevin Shirley, who continues to produce the band's albums. The first album to feature bassist Ross Valory since Frontiers and the last to feature vocalist Steve Perry and drummer Steve Smith.

Trial by Fire includes the Top 20 hit and Grammy nominated single "When You Love a Woman", which reached No. 12 and No. 1 on the Billboard Hot 100 and Adult Contemporary charts respectively. "Message of Love", "Can't Tame the Lion" and "If He Should Break Your Heart" were released as singles and received radio airplay.

The album reflected a growing maturity with the members of Journey and could be loosely termed a concept album with many tracks reflecting a more overt spirituality in lyrical content. The title track, for example, is taken directly from Paul's Second Epistle to the Corinthians.

Trial by Fire is Journey's only album to not be accompanied by a supporting tour. That was due to internal disputes over a tour (originally scheduled for the summer and fall of 1997), as a result of Perry's hip injury as he was unsure about getting the necessary surgery. The band ultimately gave him the choice of either getting the surgery or being replaced with a new lead vocalist, resulting in his departure. Drummer Steve Smith also quit citing that the band without Perry did not interest him; he would subsequently return in 2015, but was dismissed from the band again in 2020.

On November 9, 1996, the album entered at No. 3 on the Billboard 200 and was eventually certified platinum in the United States by the RIAA. The band did not receive another platinum award until Revelation in 2008.

Background
Trial by Fire was Journey's first studio album in ten years, following Raised on Radio in 1986 and the band's subsequent split. Neal Schon and Jonathan Cain had formed supergroup Bad English and released albums in 1989 and 1991, while singer Steve Perry released his second solo album, For the Love of Strange Medicine (1994). While on a solo tour in 1994, it became apparent to Perry that "underneath it all, I was missing more and more being the singer in Journey than I ever thought I would." When A&R executive John Kalodner of Columbia Records suggested the band reform, Cain, Perry, and Schon began writing together. According to Perry, they wanted to "see if we had the spark to write again" instead of simply reforming for a comeback tour. "I was invited – and quickly uninvited," recalled Gregg Rolie, who had left in 1980.

Perry said the band did not try to reinvent themselves on the album: "Nothing sounds more pretentious than someone being something they're not. One of the things we've always known is that there are certain musical directions that fit what [our] chemistry is about. We're going to sink or swim being what we are and not by trying to reinvent ourselves and not by trying to be the flavor of the month."

Track listing

Personnel
Journey
Steve Perry – lead vocals
Neal Schon – guitars, backing vocals
Jonathan Cain – keyboards, piano, backing vocals, engineer
Ross Valory – bass guitar, backing vocals
Steve Smith – drums

Additional musicians
Paulinho da Costa – percussion
Scott Pinkerton – programming
David Campbell – string arrangements

Production
Kevin Shirley – producer, engineer, mixing
George Massenburg – engineer, mixing
John Hurlbut, Bob Levy – engineers
George Marino – mastering
John Kalodner – A&R

Charts

Weekly charts

Singles

Certifications and sales

References

Journey (band) albums
1996 albums
Columbia Records albums
Albums produced by Kevin Shirley